Diaphus richardsoni, is a species of lanternfish found worldwide.

Size

Etymology
The fish is named in honor of surgeon-naturalist John Richardson (1787–1865), who was the first collector and writer on lanternfishes from the Indo-Pacific.

References

Myctophidae
Taxa named by Åge Vedel Tåning
Fish described in 1932